Walter Volodymyr Petryshyn (Vladimir Petryshin) (January 22, 1929 - March 21, 2020) was a famous Ukrainian mathematician. 
On May 6, 1996,  Petryshyn killed his wife, Ukrainian-American painter Arcadia Olenska-Petryshyn. He suffered from a severe depression which caused the tragedy and was found not guilty by reason of insanity. In 2012, he became a fellow of the American Mathematical Society.

References

External links
Volodymyr (Walter) Petryshyn
Petryshyn at MacTutor

1929 births
2020 deaths
Ukrainian mathematicians
Fellows of the American Mathematical Society